Assemblage may refer to:

 Assemblage (art)
 Assemblage (composition)
 Assemblage (archaeology)
 Assemblage (philosophy), a concept developed by Gilles Deleuze and Félix Guattari
 Faunal assemblage, floral assemblage, or fossil assemblage, in archaeology and paleontology, a collection of animal or plant fossil taxa found together, the vertical range of which may define biostratigraphic assemblage zones
 Species assemblage, in biology, all the species that exist in a particular habitat
 Assemblage 23, a futurepop/EBM group
 Assemblage (album), a compilation album by the British band Japan
 Assemblage (journal), a defunct architectural journal
 Assemblage in real estate, see plottage

See also
 A New Philosophy of Society: Assemblage Theory and Social Complexity, a 2006 book by Manuel DeLanda
 Assembly (disambiguation)